The twelfth season of the American animated television series SpongeBob SquarePants, created by former marine biologist and animator Stephen Hillenburg, began airing on Nickelodeon in the United States on November 11, 2018, and ended on April 29, 2022. It consists of 26 half-hours of 48 segments, along with five additional specials, making it the longest season of the whole show. The series chronicles the exploits and adventures of the title character and his various friends in the fictional underwater city of Bikini Bottom. The season was executive produced by series creator Hillenburg. The showrunners for this season are Marc Ceccarelli and Vincent Waller, who are also the co-executive producers. This was the last season Hillenburg was involved in before his death on November 26, 2018.

The SpongeBob SquarePants: The Complete Twelfth Season DVD was released in region 1 on January 12, 2021, before several episodes aired in the United States; however, the episode "Kwarantined Krab" was not included on the DVD due to the episode's plot being unintentionally similar to the COVID-19 pandemic, which was ongoing at the time of the DVD's release.

Production
On May 23, 2017, it was announced that the series had been renewed for a twelfth season consisting of 26 episodes. The season began airing on November 11, 2018.

Episodes

The episodes are ordered below according to Nickelodeon's packaging order, and not their original production or broadcast order.

Specials

DVD release 
The DVD boxset for season twelve was released by Paramount Home Entertainment and Nickelodeon in the United States and Canada on January 12, 2021; a few episodes on this DVD by then had yet to air on American television. "Kwarantined Krab" is excluded from this DVD due to being too unintentionally similar to the ongoing COVID-19 pandemic, making this the second season DVD to exclude an episode from its set, after The Complete 1st Season which excluded "Help Wanted".

Notes

References

SpongeBob SquarePants seasons
2018 American television seasons
2019 American television seasons
2020 American television seasons
2021 American television seasons
2022 American television seasons